Lars Kim Björkegren (born 18 December 1981) is a Swedish football manager who currently serves as the manager of Racing Louisville FC in the U.S. National Women's Soccer League. He was hired from Cyprus champions Apollon Ladies FC after the 2020–21 European season. Björkegren has earlier won Damallsvenskan with Linköpings FC and has worked as a manager in China. Kim is the only Swedish manager since Sven-Göran Eriksson who won two domestic titles in two different countries.

Coaching career 
Kim Björkegren started his coaching career in his hometown of Linköping, where he coached the Karle IF's men's team in Swedish division 4. After climbing the ladder with men's teams such as Kisa BK and IK Gauthiod Kim began to coach women's football after accepting a role as head coach for Hovås/Billdal in 2016.

IK Gauthiod 
Björkegren went to IK Gauthiod for a role in the youth team of Tyresö FF, where he was meant to take over the senior team after Tony Gustavsson's departure. But when the club folded, Björkegren moved to Grästorp and IK Gauthiod. The spell in Gauthiod was successful for Björkegren, who led his team to a 5th place in the Swedish division 2. The team also qualified for the Swedish cup, by winning the DM final against IFK Tidaholm with 3–1. After only one season with IK Gauthiod, Kim decided to leave with the motivation he had to coach a team at a higher level.

Linköpings FC 
Björkegren replaced Martin Sjögren as the manager of the reigning champions Linköpings FC in 2017 with the clear articulated goal of defending the title as the champions. Björkegren and Linköping secured the title in the 2017 Damallsvenskan with two rounds to go, despite the fact that they lost influential key players such as, Pernille Harder, Fridolina Rolfö, and Stina Blackstenius before the start of the season. In addition, team captain Magdalena Eriksson was sold to Chelsea mid season. During the successful season in 2017, Björkegren led Linköpings FC not only to become the league champions, but also to reach their best ever position in the UEFA Women's Champions League, where he guided the team to the quarterfinal.

Beijing BG Phoenix 
In January 2018, Björkegren was presented as the new manager for the Chinese club Beijing BG Phoenix, which made him the first Swedish coach in the Chinese Super League. Björkegren appointed the newly retired Swedish player, Elena Sadiku, to become his assistant coach. Björkegren who also was in charge of the clubs transfers, signed the Spanish star Vero Boquete as his first signing to his new club, and later the Swedish striker Marija Banusic. 

Björkegren decided to leave China after the 2019 season, to move back to Europe and to be closer to his family.

Apollon Ladies FC 
In June 2020 it was announced that Björkegren had been appointed as the manager for the Cypriotic Champions, Apollon Ladies FC, prior to their 2020–21 campaign. Apollon had a goal to defend the championship title and advance further in UEFA Women's Champions League.

Björkegren led Apollon Ladies FC to win the domestic league in Cyprus, and went thru the season without losing one single game. When the league finished, Apollon had took 64 out of 64 points, winning the league with a stunning goal difference of 105+

When Björkegren led Apollon Ladies to win the title, he made history by becoming the first Swedish coach to win a league in two different countries.

After the success with Apollon Ladies FC, Björkegren was awarded Coach of the Year, by PASP, the finest rewards a coach could win in Cyprus.

Racing Louisville FC 
On 9 December 2021, it was announced that Björkegren would become the new head coach (American equivalent to "manager") of Racing Louisville FC, which had completed their first season in the National Women's Soccer League several weeks earlier.

Honours 
 Winner coach of the year 2020–21
 Winner Cypriot League 2020–21
 Runner-up Cypriot League cup 2020–21
 3rd Place Chinese FA cup 2018
 3rd Place Chinese League cup 2018
 Winner Damallsvenskan 2017
 Runner-up Swedish cup 2017

References 

1981 births
Living people
Sportspeople from Linköping
Linköpings FC
Swedish football managers
Swedish expatriate football managers
Expatriate football managers in China
Swedish expatriate sportspeople in China
Expatriate football managers in Cyprus
Swedish expatriate sportspeople in Cyprus
Expatriate soccer managers in the United States
Swedish expatriate sportspeople in the United States
Racing Louisville FC coaches
National Women's Soccer League coaches